"What You'll Do When I'm Gone" is a song written by Larry Butler, and recorded by American country music artist Waylon Jennings.  It was released in September 1986 as the third single from the album Will the Wolf Survive.  The song reached number 8 on the Billboard Hot Country Singles & Tracks chart.

Chart performance

References

1986 singles
Waylon Jennings songs
Song recordings produced by Jimmy Bowen
MCA Records singles
Songs written by Larry Butler (producer)
1986 songs